Ichak Kalderon Adizes is an Yugoslavian American business consultant and former tenured professor.

Early life
Ichak Adizes was born in North Macedonia. As a Jewish child during World War II, he hid in Albania as a Muslim for protection. The story was documented in a film entitled I Want To Remember, He Wants To Forget.

In 1948, Adizes moved with his family to Israel, where he served in the Israel Defense Forces. After completing his undergraduate education, he moved to the United States in 1963, where he obtained a doctorate degree in business from Columbia University.

Career
From 1967 to 1982 Adizes was a tenured professor at UCLA, then at Stanford, Tel Aviv University, Hebrew University and Columbia University's executive programs.

Adizes founded the Adizes Institute, which is based in Santa Barbara, California. He is well known in the corporate world for developing the PAEI management model in early 1970s, that categorizes managers into four key roles Producer, Administrator, Entrepreneur and Integrator.

Adizes was named as one of the top communicators in the world alongside Pope Francis, Dalai Lama, Angela Merkel as per the 2017 Holmes Report.

Bibliography
Adizes has authored several books on corporate management:

 Corporate Lifecycles: How and why Corporations Grow and Die and what to Do about it
 The Pursuit of Prime
 Mastering Change – Introduction to Organizational Therapy
The Ideal Executive
Managing Corporate Lifecycles: How organizations Grow, Age and Die
Management/Mismanagement Styles
How to solve the Mismanagement Crisis
The Ideal Executive
Leading the Leaders
How to Manage in times of Crisis
From Stuckness to Growth
The Power of Opposites
Conversations with CEOs

Personal life
Adizes is married to Nurit Manne Adizes. They have six children and live in Carpinteria, California. He plays the accordion.

Children
Atalia Omer, Topaz Adizes, Shoham Adizes, Nimrod Omer, Cnaan Hamburger, Sapphire Adizes.

References

Jewish American economists
Jewish American writers
American company founders
Business writers
Israeli emigrants to the United States
Living people
Macedonian businesspeople
Macedonian non-fiction writers
American management consultants
People from Carpinteria, California
UCLA Anderson School of Management faculty
1937 births
21st-century American Jews